The Journal of Portfolio Management (also known as JPM) is a quarterly academic journal for finance and investing, covering topics such as asset allocation, performance measurement, market trends, risk management, and portfolio optimization. The journal was established in 1974 by Peter L. Bernstein. The current editor-in-chief is Frank J. Fabozzi (Yale University).

Notable authors 

Notable authors who have published in The Journal of Portfolio Management include Fischer Black, Daniel Kahneman, Harry Markowitz, Merton Miller, Franco Modigliani, Paul Samuelson, William F. Sharpe, James Tobin, Cliff Asness, and Jack L. Treynor.

Awards

Bernstein Fabozzi/Jacobs Levy Award 

An annual Bernstein Fabozzi/Jacobs Levy Award is presented by the journal's editors, who pick the best paper of the year with a selected panel of board members and readers. Past winners include Merton Miller, Steve Strongin, Burton Malkiel and Aleksander Radisich, and Robert D. Arnott and Ronald J. Ryan.

Quant of the Year 

The journal instituted the annual Quant of the Year Award to recognize a researcher’s history of outstanding contributions to the field of quantitative portfolio theory. It complements the Bernstein Fabozzi/Jacobs Levy Award, which JPM established in 1999 to acknowledge the most innovative research paper published in a given year by JPM.

See also
Financial Analysts Journal, covers a similar topic area

References

External links
 

Finance journals
Publications established in 1974
Quarterly journals
English-language journals